Madhuca costulata is a plant in the family Sapotaceae. The specific epithet costulata means "finely ribbed", referring to the leaves.

Description
The bark is greyish. Inflorescences bear up to six flowers.

Distribution and habitat
Madhuca costulata is endemic to Borneo. Its habitat is mixed dipterocarp forests to  altitude.

Conservation
Madhuca costulata has been assessed as vulnerable on the IUCN Red List. The species is threatened by logging and conversion of land for palm oil plantations.

References

costulata
Endemic flora of Borneo
Trees of Borneo
Plants described in 1908